Terrance Davin Cauthen (born May 14, 1976) is an American boxer.  Nicknamed "Heat", Cauthen won the Lightweight Bronze medal at the 1996 Summer Olympics.

Cauthen grew up in Trenton, New Jersey and trained in Philadelphia.

Amateur achievements 
 1995 United States Amateur Lightweight champion
Member of the 1996 US Olympic Team as a Lightweight. A Bronze Medalist, his results were:
 Round of 32:Defeated Mohamad Abdulaev of Uzbekistan- PTS (18-6)
 Round of 16:Defeated Tumentsetseg Uitumen of Mongolia – PTS (10-9)
 Quarterfinal:Defeated Pongsith Wiangwiset of Thailand – PTS (14-10)
 Semifinal:Lost to Tontcho Tontchev of Bulgaria- PTS (12-15)

Professional career
Cauthen began his professional career in 1996 and built up a 15 fight winning streak heading into a 1999 showdown against the powerful Teddy Reid.  Reid won via TKO in the 4th, and Cauthen set forth on an 11 fight winning streak to rebuild his credibility. This came to an abrupt end with a split decision loss to journeyman Dairo Esalas followed by a unanimous decision loss to rising star Paul Williams (boxer). Cauthen has yet to fight for a title, and another 5 fight winning streak came to end in with a loss to contender Sechew Powell in an IBF title eliminator. Following the loss to Powwll, Cauthen lost two of his next three fights.

Professional boxing record

References

External links
 

1976 births
Living people
Boxers from New Jersey
Boxers at the 1996 Summer Olympics
Olympic bronze medalists for the United States in boxing
Sportspeople from Trenton, New Jersey
Winners of the United States Championship for amateur boxers
Medalists at the 1996 Summer Olympics
American male boxers
Lightweight boxers